A Sense of Freedom is the twelfth album by Irish folk and rebel band The Wolfe Tones.

Track listing 
 Merman
 Sgt. William Bailey
 Farewell to Dublin
 Admiral William Brown
 Catalpa
 Irish Eyes
 Flower of Scotland
 Michael Collins
 Slainte Dana no Baird/Cailin O Chois tSiuire Me/Planxty McGuire
 Galtee Mountain Boy
 The Piper that Played Before Moses
 Let the People Sing
 Joe McDonnell

The Wolfe Tones albums
1983 albums